The Lake Dysnai is the second largest lake in Lithuania. With average depth of only  it is one of the shallowest lakes in Lithuania. Dūkštas Train Station is the closest train station to the Lake Dysnai (route Vilnius-Turmantas). It is approximately a 2 hours ride by train from Vilnius, the capital of Lithuania.

Dysnai is connected with the Lake Dysnykštis. Dysna River, tributary to the Daugava River, flows through the Lake Dysnai. Since 1988, the lake host annual festival Dysnai by workers of nearby Ignalina Nuclear Power Plant.

References

Dysnai